The 1909–10 Sheffield Shield season was the 18th season of the Sheffield Shield, the domestic first-class cricket competition of Australia. South Australia won the championship.

Table

Statistics

Most Runs
Clem Hill 609

Most Wickets
Sid Emery 23

References

Sheffield Shield
Sheffield Shield
Sheffield Shield seasons